"The Sunken Yacht" is a 10-page Disney comics story written, drawn, and lettered by Carl Barks. Characters in the story include Donald Duck, his nephews Huey, Dewey and Louie, Uncle Scrooge, an artist, and a boxer. The story was first published in Walt Disney's Comics and Stories #104 (May 1949). The story has been reprinted several times since.

The story is about Donald's attempts to salvage Scrooge's sunken yacht for an exorbitant price. Donald raises the yacht by filling it with ping pong balls. Scrooge outwits his nephew at every turn however and Donald is the loser at the end of the story.

In 1964, Danish inventor Karl Kroyer salvaged a shipwreck by pumping expandable polystyrene foam balls into its hull. He was denied a patent for the process because it had already been described in the comic.

See also
List of Disney comics by Carl Barks

References

External links
 "The Sunken Yacht" at Inducks

Disney comics stories
Donald Duck comics by Carl Barks
1949 in comics